Lawson Colin Chatterley (born 15 February 1945) is an English former professional football player and coach. He represented England at Youth level.

Playing career
Chatterley was born in Birmingham and began his career as an apprentice at Aston Villa, turning professional in February 1962, with his league debut coming the following season. He remained at Villa Park for over 9 years, making 153 league appearances and scoring 26 goals. During his stay at Villa Park, Aston Villa were relegated from Division 1 in 1967 and again from Division 2 in 1970.

In March 1971 he joined Doncaster Rovers on loan, where he first met Lawrie McMenemy, who was to have a considerable influence on his later career. With his time at Villa at an end, Chatterley was sold to Northampton Town in September 1971 for £8,000. His stay at Northampton was only a short one, rejoining McMenemy at Grimsby Town in February 1972 for £8,000. In his first season at Blundell Park, Grimsby were champions of Division 4, and spent the next 2 seasons in Division 3, finishing in a creditable 9th and then 6th place.

He scored 16 times in 73 league games for Grimsby before a £15,000 move to Southampton in March 1974, once again linking up with McMenemy. He played the last two games of Saints' 1973-74 relegation season. As the team struggled to shine in the Second Division, Chatterley became the butt of the crowd's frustration, and, in February 1975, he moved to Torquay United as player-coach, where he was to play a further 57 league games and score 10 goals.

Coaching career
After leaving Torquay he played for North Devon non-league side Barnstaple Town and opened a guest house. However, he was lured back into football, firstly as coach of Chicago Sting in the U.S., and then, in 1979, as McMenemy's right-hand-man back at Southampton. During his 6-year spell at The Dell, Saints enjoyed some of their finest moments including briefly topping the Football League tables in January 1982 (finishing the 1981-82 season in 7th place), and then finishing the 1983-84 season as runners-up to Liverpool.

In 1985, he chose to accompany McMenemy to Sunderland, despite being in contention for the vacant manager's job at The Dell. McMenemy's sacking in April 1987 precipitated Chatterley's resignation from his position at Roker Park a few weeks later.

He returned to the Southampton area in 1987 and was manager of The Clump Inn in Chilworth, and took a role as manager at Poole Town, before becoming Ian Branfoot's assistant at Reading in June 1988. In October 1989, he acted as caretaker manager following Branfoot's sacking, handing over the reins to Ian Porterfield in November.

In January 1990, Chatterley returned to The Dell as a youth development officer, and, in July 1991, once again became a coach under Ian Branfoot who had recently been appointed Southampton's manager. In January 1994, following Branfoot's  departure, he briefly acted as caretaker manager in tandem with Dave Merrington, taking charge of the team for one match, before Alan Ball's appointment. He was then promoted to the role of assistant manager, a post he retained until the appointment of Graeme Souness in July 1996.

He then joined Newcastle United for a brief spell as a scout, before retraining as a teacher.

From 1998 to 2016, Chatterley was full-time football coach at Winchester College. He enjoyed considerable success there, with the school reaching the semi finals of the Independent Schools Cup for the first time.

References

External links
Article about Lew Chatterley on Grimsby Town Supporters' Trust website

Footballers from Birmingham, West Midlands
English footballers
Southampton F.C. players
Aston Villa F.C. players
Doncaster Rovers F.C. players
Grimsby Town F.C. players
Northampton Town F.C. players
Torquay United F.C. players
1945 births
Living people
Barnstaple Town F.C. players
Association football midfielders